6800 may refer to:

Electronic technology
 Motorola 6800, a microprocessor
 GeForce 6800, a series of graphics cards from Nvidia
 Nokia 6800 series, mobile phones

Other
 GWR 6800 Class, a class of steam locomotives